Saint Dominic in Soriano was a portrait of Saint Dominic  painted in 1530. It is an important artefact in the Dominican friary at Soriano Calabro in southern Italy. It was believed to be of miraculous origin, and to inspire miracles. It was the subject of a Roman Catholic feast day celebrated on 15 September from 1644 to 1913. Its miraculous origin was the subject of several 17th-century paintings. Several ecclesiastical buildings have been named after it.

History
There seems to be no record that Dominic himself ventured further south in Italy than Rome. In 1510, members of the Dominican Order founded a friary at Soriano Calabro, Calabria, in the arch of the foot of the boot of Italy. A town grew up around it. In 1530, the friars began to display for public veneration a portrait of the founder of their Order. 

In the early 17th century, Silvestro Frangipane, a Dominican, investigated the painting and wrote a book about it. Several senior members of his Order gave it their imprimaturs, and it was published in 1634.

Fra Frangipane wrote (in an English translation): 

That narrative is largely the one accepted by the Dominican Order today.

The portrait soon acquired a reputation for having marvellous properties. According to Fra Frangipane, if it was ever hung in a place other than the one specified by the Virgin Mary, the following morning it would be back in its proper place. He described numerous other miracles attributed to its presence. No fewer than 1,600 miracles were reliably attributed to its presence within a space of 78 years. In 1644, Pope Innocent XII ordained a feast day on 15 September to commemorate its origin and properties. The feast may have been suppressed in 1913, when Pope Pius X moved what had until then been the movable feast of Our Lady of Sorrows to the fixed date of 15 September.

The more recent history of the portrait seems to be unknown. It was rebuilt; but in 1783, Calabria was struck by a series of five earthquakes within two months. The first, on 5 February, was of 7.0 magnitude, and levelled Soriano to the ground. The third, on 7 February, was of 6.6 magnitude, and its epicentre was 3 km from Soriano. In Soriano itself, 171 people had died, and damage estimated at 80,000 ducats had been caused. The friary was rebuilt for a second time, but seems never to have regained its earlier reputation; it seems to disappear from the records. The portrait may have failed to survive one of those events.

A description of the painting
In 1634, Fra Frangipane wrote:

An English translation:

Artistic representations
The miraculous origin of the portrait seems to have been a significant topic for religious art in 17th-century Italy and Spain, as evidenced by the number of paintings described later in this section. It is uncertain which, if any, of the painters had seen the original. Those paintings are consistent in showing Dominic slightly less than life-size, full length, wearing his habit, with book and lily, thus generally conforming to Fra Frangipane's 1634 description; but differ in detail. They are also consistent in another way: all show the three saints exhibiting the open painting to one or more friars.

Examples (with provenance, where known) include (arranged approximately by date):
 Carlo Bononi (Italy).
 1626Francisco de Zurbarán (Spain)Santa María Magdalena, Seville.
 1629Juan Bautista Maíno (Spain)Museo del Prado, Madrid.
 1640Matteo Rosselli (Italy)Church of San Marco, Florence.
 Mid 17th centuryJacopo Vignali (Italy)Convent of San Marco, Florence; one of the first examples taken from the original.
 Alonzo Cano (Spain)Indianapolis Museum of Art, Indiana.

 Antonio de Pereda (Spain)Museo Cerralbo, Madrid.
 Giovanni Benedetto Castiglione (Italy) (the male figure at bottom right is Saint Ambrose)Santa Maria di Castello, Genoa.
 Pedro Atanasio Bocanegra (Spain)once in the collection of William Coesvelt, Amsterdam; in 1815, purchased by Tsar Alexander I of Russia; now in the Hermitage Museum, St Petersburg.
 Last third of 17th centuryAndrés Amaya (Spain)Museo Nacional de Escultura, Valladolid.

Ecclesiastical buildings
Ecclesiastical buildings named after, and so perhaps dedicated to, Saint Dominic in Soriano include (arranged by date):
 , a church in Tenerife, Canary Islands, on the site of the former Convent of Santo Domingo Soriano (founded 1649).
 , a church in Naples (founded 1673).
 Santo Domingo de Soriano, a church in Villa Soriano, Uruguay (building begun 1751).

Notes

References

External links
  An extremely detailed, but completely unsourced, account of the portrait's miraculous origin, which shows how some people in the 21st century still hold it in especial reverence.

1530 paintings
Portraits by Italian artists
16th-century portraits
Lost paintings
Christian miracles
Dominican Order
Paintings of Saint Dominic
Books in art